An aperture card is a type of punched card with a cut-out window into which a chip of microfilm is mounted.  Such a card is used for archiving or for making multiple inexpensive copies of a document for ease of distribution.  The card is typically punched with machine-readable metadata associated with the microfilm image, and printed across the top of the card for visual identification; it may also be punched by hand in the form of an edge-notched card.  The microfilm chip is most commonly 35mm in height, and contains an optically reduced image, usually of some type of reference document, such as an engineering drawing, that is the focus of the archiving process.  Machinery exists to automatically store, retrieve, sort, duplicate, create, and digitize cards with a high level of automation.

Aperture cards have several advantages and disadvantages when compared to digital systems.  While many aperture cards still play an important role in archiving, their role is gradually being replaced by digital systems.

Usage 
Aperture cards are used for engineering drawings from all engineering disciplines.  The U.S. Department of Defense once made extensive use of aperture cards, and some are still in use, but most data is now digital.

Information about the drawing, for example the drawing number, could be both punched and printed on the remainder of the card.  With the proper machinery, this allows for automated handling.  In the absence of such machinery, the cards can still be read by a human with a lens and a light source.

Advantages 
Aperture cards have, for archival purposes, some advantages over digital systems.  They have a 500-year lifetime, they are human readable, and there is no expense or risk in converting from one digital format to the next when computer systems become obsolete.

Disadvantages 

Most of the disadvantages are related to the well established differences in analog and digital technology. In particular, searching for given strings within content is considerably slower.  Handling physical cards requires proprietary machinery and processing optical film takes significant time.

The very nature of microfilm cameras and the high contrast properties of microfilm stock itself also impose limits on the amount of detail that can be resolved particularly at the higher reduction ratios (36x or greater) needed to film larger drawings. Faded drawings or those of low or uneven contrast do not reproduce well and significant detail or annotations may be lost.

In common with other forms of microfilm, mis-filing cards after use, particularly in large archives, results in the card being for all intents and purposes lost forever unless it's later found by accident.

Aperture cards created from 35mm roll film mounted on to blank cards have to be treated with great care. Bending the card can cause the film to detach and excessive pressure to a stack of cards can cause the mounting glue to ooze creating clumps of cards which will feed through duplicators and other machinery either poorly or not at all. Feeding a de-laminated card through machinery not only risks destroying the image, but also risks jamming or damaging the machinery.

Machinery 
A set of cards could be rapidly sorted by drawing number or other punched data using a card sorter.  Machines are now available that scan aperture cards and produce a digital version.  Aperture card plotters are machines that use a laser to create the image on the film.

Conversion 
Aperture cards can be converted to digital documents using scanning equipment and software. Scanning can allow for significant image cleanup and enhancement. Often, the digital image produced is better than the visual quality available prescan.

References

External links 
 1959 Defense Technical Information Center report on the technology and its use for submitting engineering plans to the military.
 Detailed description of a particular format of Aperture cards from WIPO.
 Detailed information regarding duplicating microforms and aperture cards (select and highlight to read black on black text)
 Ronald Kay, chief executive of UCCA, is seen holding an aperture card. The cards held a microfilm image of a candidate's applications to UK universities, and were used to print batches of applications sorted by the university and course applied to.

Archival science
History of computing
Infographics
Technical drawing
Electronic documents